The following is a list of television programs by episode count. Episode numbers for ongoing daytime dramas, such as soap operas, are drawn from the websites for the shows. Daily news broadcasts, such as The Today Show, Good Morning America, and SportsCenter, are not episodic in nature and are not listed.

Single show
This is a list of television programs by episode count with 3,200 episodes minimum.

See also
 List of longest-running U.S. cable television series
 List of most watched television broadcasts
 List of longest-running U.S. primetime television series
 List of longest-running U.S. first-run syndicated television series
 Lists of television programs by episode count

Notes

References

Episode count